My Father and My Son is a 2005 Turkish drama film written and directed by Çağan Irmak about a family torn apart by the 1980 Turkish coup d'état. The film which went on nationwide release on  became one of the highest-grossing Turkish films in history.

Plot
In order to study journalism at Istanbul University, Sadık leaves his village on the Aegean coast.  This angers his father, Hüseyin, who wants him to study Agricultural Engineering so he can manage the family farm. During his years at university Sadık becomes a militant in left wing politics. Upon learning about Sadık's behavior, Hüseyin disowns him.

However worse days are ahead for Sadık.  In the early hours of the morning on 12 September 1980 Sadık's pregnant wife starts having contractions.  The couple runs outside, but they can't find anyone to take them to the hospital, due to a curfew.  The country has been taken over in a military coup.  Sadık's wife gives birth in a park and dies, but their son, Deniz, possibly named after leftist youth icon Deniz Gezmiş, survives.

Because of his political activities, Sadık is arrested, tortured, and imprisoned for three years during which time he loses his health.  A few years after being released, he finds out that he will die.  Having no other choice, he takes Deniz back to his family farm on the Aegean into the care of his mother and his father, who still does not speak to him.  For Deniz, who is absorbed in the magical world of comic books, meeting his relatives on the farm is a new experience.  There is his grandmother (Hümeyra Akbay) who drives a tractor and speaks on a short wave radio, his aunt Hanife (Binnur Kaya) who wears bracelets from her wrist all the way to her shoulder, and his uncle (Yetkin Dikinciler) who is a little naive.

There is trouble in store, however, for Sadık and Hüseyin who must come to terms with their past and each other.  Sadık also needs to face his first love, now married with two children, and the question of old friends.  However his sickness takes over and Sadık passes away.  His parents take over the responsibility of Deniz who comes into term with his father's loss.

Awards
The film won an award for its soundtrack at the World Soundtrack Awards, awarded to Evanthia Reboutsika.

Kuşkan was given the Best actor award at the 25th Istanbul Film Festival for his performance in Babam ve Oğlum.

Cast
 Fikret Kuşkan – Sadık
 Çetin Tekindor – Hüseyin
 Hümeyra – Nuran
 Şerif Sezer – Gülbeyaz Teyze
  – Deniz
 Özge Özberk – Birgül
 Tuba Büyüküstün – Aysun
 Yetkin Dikinciler – Salim
 Binnur Kaya – Hanife
 Halit Ergenç – Özkan
  – Kahya

References

External links
 
 
 

2005 films
2000s Turkish-language films
2005 drama films
Turkish drama films
Films set in the 1980s
Films set in İzmir
Films directed by Çağan Irmak
Films shot in İzmir
Films shot in Istanbul
Films about coups d'état